Park Jong-hun (born August 13, 1991) is a South Korean professional baseball pitcher for the SSG Landers of the KBO League.

He is known for his submarine pitch style.

He represented South Korea at the 2018 Asian Games and the WSBC Premier12.

He is on the roster for the South Korea Olympics Team 2020

References

External links
Career statistics and player information from Korea Baseball Organization

Park Jong-hun at SK Wyverns Baseball Club 

1991 births
Living people
Baseball players at the 2018 Asian Games
Asian Games gold medalists for South Korea
Medalists at the 2018 Asian Games
Asian Games medalists in baseball
KBO League pitchers
SSG Landers players
South Korean baseball players
People from Gunsan
Sportspeople from North Jeolla Province